The Internet in Norway is available through Fiber or Mobile. The country code top level domain is .no.

History 
In 1973, Norway became the first country other than the United States on the ARPANET. NORSAR (Norwegian Seismic Array) at Kjeller just outside Oslo was connected by satellite to the SDAC (Seismic Data Analysis Center) in Virginia, US as part of ARPANET in order to monitor nuclear test-ban treaties with the Soviet Union. A connection from NORSAR to UCL in London was added approximately a month later.

Top-level domain

 is the Internet country code top-level domain (ccTLD) for Norway. Norid, the domain name registry, is based in Trondheim, is owned by the state-owned Uninett and operates under supervision of the Norwegian Post and Telecommunications Authority. As of 9 July 2021 there are  824,489  registered -domains. Domain registrations are limited to organizations with a presence in Norway and registration at the Brønnøysund Register Centre; each organization is limited to 100 domains. In addition, individuals residing in Norway may register in the second-level domain . Other second-level domains exist for organizations of certain types, such as municipalities and schools. The strict regulations have resulted in near-absence of cybersquatting and Norway is the most Northern Scandinavian country  warehousing.

Users

In 2013, almost 100% of the Norwegian population had access to the Internet.

Broadband access

In 2021, Norway ranked 51st out of 193 countries with 2,134,105  fixed broadband Internet subscriptions giving 40.23 subscriptions per 100 population (11th in the world). Also in 2020, Norway ranked 107th out of 193 countries with 5,721,255 mobile broadband Internet subscriptions giving 107.84 subscriptions per 100 population (95th in the world).

Lyse, Norway, with an average measured connection speed of 8.1 Mbit/s, is the fastest city in Europe according to a 2011 report from Akamai.

ADSL

ADSL became available to private consumers around late 2000. Depending on the provider, offered speeds range from 512/128 kbit/s to as high as 8/1 Mbit/s for ADSL, while ADSL2+ is slowly becoming available with speeds reaching up to 24/1.5 Mbit/s.
Fiber is also almost in every city in Norway now speeds ranging from 2/2 Mbit/s up to 10000/10000 Mbit/s (the fastest available consumer line, only available in place with support for it). Prices vary constantly due to fierce competition between providers, but prices can be found as low as 195 NOK (US$30) per month for the most basic ADSL connections, while ADSL2+ is somewhat higher, starting around 499,-(NextGenTel) NOK (US$82) per month. This is in addition to DSL equipment rental and installation fees.

Some major ISPs that provide DSL services in Norway:
 NextGenTel - http://www.nextgentel.no/
 Tele2 - https://web.archive.org/web/20080916222806/http://www.tele2.no/
 Ventelo - http://www.ventelo.no/ 
 Altibox - https://www.altibox.no/

There is also a flurry of smaller and local providers all over the country that offer competitive DSL services.
 Nordcall Bredbånd - http://www.nordcall.no
 Mimer Bredbånd - http://www.mimer.no
 Eidsiva Bredbånd - http://www.eidsiva.net
 Enivest AS - http://www.enivest.no/

Cable

Cable Internet access was available before DSL access, starting around 2000.

Cable ISPs:
 Telia (formerly known as UPC/Chello/Get) – http://www.telia.no/
 Telenor – http://www.telenor.no/fiber
 And many other SMATV networks such as BOF AS – https://web.archive.org/web/20100309101646/http://www.bof-nett.no/

Triple play solutions over optical fiber are increasing in availability and popularity.

As November 2012, all known services include unlimited download with no restrictions.

Internet censorship
The constitution and law provide for freedom of speech and press, and the government generally respects these rights in practice. An independent press, an effective judiciary, and a functioning democratic political system combine to ensure freedom of speech and of the press. The law prohibits “threatening or insulting anyone, or inciting hatred or repression of or contempt for anyone because of his or her: a) skin color or national or ethnic origin, b) religion or life stance, or c) homosexuality, lifestyle, or orientation.” Violators are subject to a fine or imprisonment not to exceed three years. However, the law is little used. There are no government restrictions on access to the Internet or credible reports that the government monitors e-mail or Internet chat rooms without appropriate legal authority.

The OpenNet Initiative (ONI) found no evidence of Internet filtering in Norway in 2009. There is no individual ONI country profile for Norway, but it is included in the regional overview for the Nordic Countries.

Norway's major Internet service providers have a DNS filter which blocks access to sites authorities claim are known to provide child pornography, similar to Denmark's filter. A list claimed to be the Norwegian DNS blacklist was published at WikiLeaks in March 2009. The minister of justice, Knut Storberget, sent a letter dated 29 August 2008 threatening ISPs with a law compelling them to use the filter should they refuse to do so voluntarily.

On 1 September 2015 the Oslo District Court ordered ISPs to block domains belonging to seven major file-sharing websites, The Pirate Bay being among them, as the first court order in Norwegian history to block websites not related to child pornography. A second order was made on 22 June 2016, blocking a further eight file-sharing websites.

See also
 Media in Norway
 Norwegian Internet Exchange
 Norwegian Post and Telecommunications Authority
 Telecommunications in Norway

References

External links
 Norwegian Internet Exchange (NIX) page at the University of Oslo (UiO).
 Norwegian Post and Telecommunications Authority, official website ,  English version.
 A list of prices and features of all Norwegian telecommunications service providers.
  Altibox internet provider. link shows fiberspeed available for there customers